The 2012–13 FA Cup qualifying rounds opened the 132nd season of competition in England for 'The Football Association Challenge Cup' (FA Cup), the world's oldest association football single knockout competition. A total of 758 clubs were accepted for the competition, down five from the previous season's 763.

The large number of clubs entering the tournament from lower down (Levels 5 through 10) in the English football pyramid meant that the competition started with six rounds of preliminary (2) and qualifying (4) knockouts for these non-League teams. The 32 winning clubs from Fourth qualifying round progressed to the First Round Proper, where League clubs tiered at Levels 3 and 4 entered the competition.

Calendar and prizes
The calendar for the 2012–13 FA Cup qualifying rounds, as announced by the FA.

Extra preliminary round
Extra preliminary round ties were played on Friday (10 August), Saturday (11 August) and Sunday (12 August). Replays were played on Monday (13 August), Tuesday (14 August) and Wednesday (15 August). The relative immediacy of the replays was due to there only being two weeks between consecutive rounds of the competition. 400 teams, from Level 9 and Level 10 of English football, entered at this stage of the competition.

Preliminary round
Preliminary round fixtures were played on the weekend of 25 August 2012. A total of 332 teams took part in this stage of the competition, including the 200 winners from the Extra preliminary round and 132 entering at this stage from the six leagues at Level 8 of English football. The round featured 49 teams from Level 10 still in the competition, being the lowest ranked teams in this round. The draw was as follows: The draw is as follows:

First qualifying round
The First qualifying round fixtures were played on the weekend of 8 September 2012, with replays being played the following mid-week. A total of 232 clubs took part in this stage of the competition, including the 166 winners from the Preliminary round and 66 entering at this stage from the top division of the three leagues at Level 7 of English football. The round featured twenty clubs from Level 10 still in the competition, being the lowest ranked clubs in this round. The draw is as follows:

Clevedon Town's Scott Murray won the Budweiser Player of the Round with 75% of the votes.

The results were as follows:

Scott Murray, Clevedon Town
Craig Hammond, Cambridge City
Paul Booth, Maidstone United
Tony Evans, Curzon Ashton
Andy Teague, Chorley.

Second qualifying round
The Second qualifying round fixtures were played on the weekend of 22 September 2012. A total of 160 clubs took part in this stage of the competition, including the 116 winners from the First qualifying round and 44 Level 6 clubs, from Conference North and Conference South, entering at this stage. The round featured Abbey Hey, Nuneaton Griff and Wootton Bassett Town from Level 10 still in the competition, being the lowest ranked clubs in this round.
The Second qualifying round draw is as follows:

FC United of Manchester's Nicky Platt won the Budweiser Player of the Round.

The results were as follows:

Nicky Platt, FC United of Manchester
Sean Shields, St Albans City
Tom Winters, Brackley Town
Jonte Smith, Metropolitan Police
Callum Ward, Tadcaster Albion.

Third qualifying round
The Third qualifying round took place on the weekend of 6 October 2012. A total of 80 clubs took part, all having progressed from the Second qualifying round. Five clubs from Level 9 of English football, was the lowest-ranked team to qualify for this round of the competition.
The draw is as follows:

South Park's Kieran Lavery won the Budweiser Player of the Round with 33% of the votes.

The results were as follows:

Kieran Lavery, South Park
Sam Reed, Bury Town
Michael Barnes, AFC Fylde
Jamie Slabber, Chelmsford City
Jeanmal Prosper, Arlesey Town.

Fourth qualifying round
The Fourth qualifying round took place on the weekend of 20 October 2012. A total of 64 clubs took part, 40 having progressed from the Third qualifying round and 24 clubs from Conference Premier, forming Level 5 of English football, entering at this stage. The lowest-ranked sides to qualify for this round were Level 9 clubs South Park, and Blackfield & Langley. The draw is as follows:

Luton Town's Andre Gray won the Budweiser Player of the Round with 41% of the votes.

The results were as follows:

Andre Gray, Luton Town
Jake Speight, Mansfield Town
Danny Hurst, Barrow
Ryan Bowman, Hereford
Lee Carey, Hastings.

Competition proper

Winners from Fourth qualifying round advance to First Round Proper, where clubs from Level 3 and Level 4 of English football, operating in The Football League, first enter the competition. See 2012–13 FA Cup for a report of First Round Proper onwards.

References

External links
The FA Cup Archive

Qualifying
FA Cup qualifying rounds